Total Universe Man is the second album by Valient Thorr.

Track listing 
 "Prologue: Civil Blood Makes Civil Hands Unclean" – 1:50
 "Showdown" – 4:01
 "Palm Reader" – 2:59
 "Man Behind the Curtain" – 4:08
 "Intermission: Thesis of Infinite Measure" – 2:30
 "I Am the Law'" – 4:02
 "Sticks and Stones" – 3:36
 "Intermission: Theme from 6th Grade Watercolor" – 1:12
 "Hijackers" – 2:03
 "We Believe in Science" – 2:17
 "Tough Customer" – 5:44
 "Blow Up the Pyramid" – 6:58
 "Untitled" – 10:08

Trivia 
 The song "Man Behind The Curtain" is featured in the video game Skate.

References

2005 albums
Valient Thorr albums
Volcom Entertainment albums